The Central District of Abarkuh County is in Yazd province, Iran. At the National Census in 2006, its population was 29,609 in 8,238 households. The following census in 2011 counted 33,217 people in 9,821 households. At the latest census in 2016, the district had 36,907 inhabitants in 11,456 households.

References 

Abarkuh County

Districts of Yazd Province

Populated places in Yazd Province

Populated places in Abarkuh County